Cerautola fisheri is a butterfly in the family Lycaenidae. It is found in Zambia.

The larvae feed on algae and foliate lichen.

References

Butterflies described in 1999
Poritiinae
Butterflies of Africa